Wabua is a genus of Australian sheetweb spiders that was first described by V. T. Davies & C. L. Lambkin in 2000.<ref name=Davi2000>{{cite journal| last1=Davies| first1=V. T.| last2=Lambkin| first2=C. L.| year=2000| title=Wabua, a new spider genus (Araneae: Amaurobioidea: Kababinae) from north Queensland, Australia| journal=Memoirs of the Queensland Museum| pages=129–147| volume=46}}</ref>

Species
 it contains eleven species, found in Queensland:Wabua aberdeen Davies, 2000 – Australia (Queensland)Wabua cleveland Davies, 2000 – Australia (Queensland)Wabua crediton Davies, 2000 – Australia (Queensland)Wabua elliot Davies, 2000 – Australia (Queensland)Wabua eungella Davies, 2000 – Australia (Queensland)Wabua halifax Davies, 2000 – Australia (Queensland)Wabua hypipamee Davies, 2000 – Australia (Queensland)Wabua kirrama Davies, 2000 – Australia (Queensland)Wabua major Davies, 2000 (type) – Australia (Queensland)Wabua paluma Davies, 2000 – Australia (Queensland)Wabua seaview'' Davies, 2000 – Australia (Queensland)

See also
 List of Stiphidiidae species

References

Araneomorphae genera
Spiders of Australia
Stiphidiidae
Taxa named by Valerie Todd Davies